Dyula (or Jula, Dioula, Julakan ߖߎ߬ߟߊ߬ߞߊ߲) is a language of the Mande language family spoken mainly in Burkina Faso, Ivory Coast and Mali, and also in some other countries, including Ghana, Guinea and Guinea-Bissau. It is one of the Manding languages and is most closely related to Bambara, being mutually intelligible with Bambara as well as Malinke. It is a trade language in West Africa and is spoken by millions of people, either as a first or second language. Similar to the other Mande languages, it uses tones. It may be written in the Latin, Arabic or N'Ko scripts.

History 
Historically, Dyula ("jula" in the language) was not an ethonym, but rather a Manding language label literally meaning 'trader'. The term used to distinguish Muslim traders from the non-Muslim population living in the same area, mainly Senufo agricultors. It then became an exonym for Manding-speaking traders such as the Bambara or the Mandinka and their languages. At the same time, however, a process of ethnogenesis across the centuries led to some communities in modern towns like Bobo-Dioulasso, Odienné and Kong adopting the label as one of their ethnic identity. These communities speak varieties of Dyula with common traits that distinguish it from the lingua franca form of Jula that one hears in markets across much of Burkina Faso and Côte d'Ivoire.

Later, the term was also used for a simplified version of Bambara, which comes from Mali, mixed with elements of Maninka. It became a widely used lingua franca. Native speakers of Manding in the Ivory Coast use the pejorative term 'Tagbusikan' to refer to this simplified language, while they called their own language 'Konyakakan', 'Odiennekakan' or 'Maukakan'. The influx of millions of migrant workers from the Sahel further boostered the use of Dyula in the Ivory Coast due to the need of a lingua franca. Many Burkinabe learned Dyula while staying in the Ivory Coast and further disseminated it back home. Today, Dyula is used to at least some extent by 61% of the population of the Ivory Coast and by about 35% of the Burkinabe (mainly those living in the southern or western part of the country).

Phonology

Consonants

Vowels 

The seven vowel sounds may also be either lengthened  or nasalized .

Writing systems

Latin alphabet and orthography 
Dioula orthography is regulated in Burkina Faso by the Dioula Sub-Commission of the National Commission for Languages. On 15 July 1971, the National Sub-Commission for Dioula was created and on 16 July 1971, it began a study in order to set the Dioula alphabet. An alphabet was published on 27 July 1973 and gained official status on 2 February 1979.

In Burkina Faso, the Dioula alphabet is made up of 28 letters each representing a single phoneme. In the orthography, long vowels are represented by doubled letters; thus, /e/ is written  and /eː/, . The nasalisation of a vowel is written followed by an n; for example, /ẽ/ is written .

The notation of tones was recommended in 1973, but in practice they are not written. The transcription guide published in 2003 does not reiterate this recommendation. Tones are noted solely in lexicographical works. However, to avoid ambiguity, tone marking is obligatory in certain cases.

For example:

  he/she (third person singular pronoun)
  you (second person plural pronoun)

N'Ko alphabet 
The N'Ko script is an indigenous writing system for the Manding language continuum, invented in 1949 by Solomana Kanté, a Guinean educator. Today, the script has been digitised as part of Unicode, which allows it to be used easily online, but the lack of funding and the official status of French means that use of this alphabet largely happens outside of formal education and is not systematically used on street signs, etc.

Use in media 
Dioula can be heard spoken in the 2004 film Night of Truth, directed by Fanta Régina Nacro, Burkina Faso's first female director.

See also
 Dyula people

References

External links
An ka taa: a website with a dictionary, resources and media in and about Jula and Manding more generally.
Database of audio recordings in Jula (Dioula) - basic Catholic prayers

Bibliography 

 Commission nationale des langues burkinabè – Sous-commission du dioula, Guide de transcription du Dioula, Burkina Faso, 2003
 Commission nationale des langues burkinabè – Sous-commission nationale du dioula, Règles orthographiques du Dioula, Ouagadougou, Coopération suisse, 1999, 69
 Moussa Coulibaly et Haraguchi Takehiko, Lexique du Dioula, Institute of Developing Economies, 1993 (read online [archive])
 Maurice Delafosse, Vocabulaires comparatifs de plus de 60 langues ou dialectes parlés à la Côte d'Ivoire et dans les régions limitrophes, Paris, E. Leroux, 1904, 284
 Maurice Delafosse, Essai de manuel pratique de la langue mandé ou mandingue. Étude grammaticale du dialecte dyoula. Vocabulaire français-dyoula. Histoire de Samori en mandé. Étude comparée des principaux dialectes mandé, Paris, Publications de l'INALCO, 1904, 304
 Mohamadou Diallo, « Le noyau du code orthographique du dioula du Burkina Faso », Mandekan, Bulletin semestriel d’études linguistiques mandé, o 37, 2001, 9-31
 Mamadou Lamine Sanogo (master's thesis, supervised by Bakary Coulibaly), Les syntagmes nominaux du jula véhiculaire, University of Ouagadougou, 1991, 81
 Mamadou Lamine Sanogo (DEA thesis, supervised by Bakary Coulibaly), Approche définitoire du jula véhiculaire, University of Ouagadougou, 1992, 79
 Mamadou Lamine Sanogo, « Tons, segments et règles transformationnelles en jula », Mandenkan, Paris, o 30, 1995, 41-54
 Mamadou Lamine Sanogo (University of Rouen thesis, supervised by Claude Caitucoli (URA-CNRS 1164)), Langues nationales, langues véhiculaires, langue officielle et glottopolitique au Burkina Faso, 1996, 832
 Mamadou Lamine Sanogo, « Les fondements scientifiques d'une règle d'écriture orthographique : le redoublement de la voyelle finale du défini en jula », Cahiers du CERLESHS, University of Ouagadougou, o 16, 1999, 127-144
 Mamadou Lamine Sanogo, À propos de jula à Bobo-Dioulasso, 2000, 73-83, spécial 2, PUO
 Mamadou Lamine Sanogo, « L'ethisme jula : origines et évolution d'un groupe ethnolinguistique dans la boucle du Niger », dans Y. G. Madiéga et O. Nao, 1, 2003, 370-379
 Mamadou Lamine Sanogo, « À propos des constructions du syntagme complétif en dioula », Cahiers du CERLESHS, University of Ouagadougou, o 20, 2003, 179-211
 Mamadou Lamine Sanogo, « Vers une approche sociolinguistique des dérivatifs en dioula véhiculaire », Cahiers du CERLESHS, University of Ouagadougou, o 1* er numéro spécial, June 2003, 221-223
 Mamadou Lamine Sanogo, La recherche terminologique dans un dialecte couvert : le cas du dioula, Paris, Édition des archives contemporaines, 2006, 631-639
 Y. Person, Samori : Une révolution dyula, 1, Dakar, IFAN, « Mémoires de l’Institut fondamental d’Afrique noire », 1968
 Y. Person, Samori : Une révolution dyula, 2, Dakar, IFAN, « Mémoires de l’Institut fondamental d’Afrique noire », 1970
 Y. Person, Samori : Une révolution dyula, 3, Dakar, IFAN, « Mémoires de l’Institut fondamental d’Afrique noire », 1975

Manding languages
Languages of Burkina Faso
Languages of Mali
Languages of Ivory Coast
Languages of the Gambia
Languages of Guinea
Languages of Senegal